Haripirala is a village in Warangal district, Telangana state, India. It is an education hub for surrounding several small villages with Zilla Parshath High school. It is surrounded by lakes and mountains . Although the source of transportation is public sometimes people seek private transportation 

Languages spoken: Telugu (Telangana Yasa, a mixture of Urdu and Telugu), Lambade, Hindi.

Villages in Jayashankar Bhupalpally district